SSST can refer to:
 Sarajevo School of Science and Technology
 Santiago Airport (Brazil)
 GQM-163 Coyote
 Social stress